Kang Woo-suk (born November 10, 1960 in Gyeongsan) is a South Korean film producer and director. He has often been called the most powerful man in Korean cinema, topping Cine21 magazine's list of '50 Most Powerful Men in Korean Cinema' for seven consecutive years from 1998 to 2004.

Kang started as a director of successful comedy films before directing Two Cops in 1993, a box office hit whose success at the time was only surpassed by Sopyonje. More recently, he has directed several Korean blockbusters, including the Public Enemy series (Public Enemy, Another Public Enemy, and Public Enemy Returns) and Silmido.

After the success of Two Cops Kang founded his own film production and distribution company, Cinema Service, which has since become the biggest homegrown studio in the Korean film industry and along with CJ Entertainment, one of the two largest film distributors in South Korea. In 2005 Kang stepped down from the position of president of Cinema Service, claiming he intends to concentrate more on his personal film projects.

Selected filmography
The Map Against The World (2016)
Fists of Legend (2013)
Glove (2011)
Moss (2010)
Public Enemy 3 (2008)
Hanbando (2006)
Another Public Enemy (2005)
Silmido (2003)
Public Enemy (2002)
Two Cops 2 (1996)
Two Cops (1993)

Awards 
1994 30th Baeksang Arts Awards: Best Director (Two Cops)
2004 24th Blue Dragon Film Awards: Best Director (Silmido)
2010 18th Chunsa Film Art Awards: Best Director (Moss)
2010 47th Grand Bell Awards: Best Director (Moss)
2010 31st Blue Dragon Film Awards: Best Director (Moss)

See also
List of Korean film directors
Cinema of Korea

References

External links

1960 births
South Korean film directors
Living people
Sincheon Kang clan
Best Director Paeksang Arts Award (film) winners
Grand Prize Paeksang Arts Award (Film) winners